Celebrate Your Name Week (CYNW) is a holiday established in 1997 by American  onomatology hobbyist Jerry Hill. Hill prescribed the first full week in March as a week for everyone worldwide to embrace and celebrate his or her name.  It's also a week for appreciating names in general, and to have fun getting to know more about names. CYNW is a week set aside to participate in names-related hobbies, activities, and to take part in entertaining and enlightening names-related events.  It's a week to develop and celebrate a true fondness for, and genuine appreciation of, names. There are seven components that comprise CYNW: Name Tag Day, Namesake Day, Name Fun Facts Day, Unique Names Day, Learn What Your Name Means Day, Middle Name Pride Day, and Genealogy Day.

Jerry Hill Presents Names

In his childhood, Hill heard of a child who was killed in his city. The child was also named Jerry Hill. This and other occurrences made Hill increasingly curious about names, and Hill's intrigue with names grew as years passed. To celebrate an ever-developing interest in names, Hill established a website, Jerry Hill Presents Names (JHPN), which became very popular and was embraced by the Public Broadcasting Service. The website's popularity forced it to expand twice due to heavy bandwidth.  That website and its mission inspired Hill to establish Celebrate Your Name Week, now included yearly in the international publication Chase's Calendar of Annual Events.

As JHPN's audience climbed to over a quarter million visits, Hill's desire to transform visitors into participants resulted in the establishment of the CYNW website with its many ideas for all interested parties to participate in various names-related events and activities.

Examples of name celebrations

“Name days” are a primarily European practice of affixing a name to days of the year. Each day is celebrated by the people for whom that day is named.  In many cultures there are first names associated with the days of the year. The associations between the days and the names came about for many reasons, but is mostly attributable to church held festivals for saints of that name on any given day. In certain countries a person's name day is celebrated with as much dedication as one would celebrate a birthday, and may include gifts for the honoree.

Cultural celebrations of names include, for Hindus, celebrating Namkaran Samskar (Naming Ceremony). Namakaran, naming of a child, is the first real ceremony held for the newborn Hindu child. The ceremony is usually held on the 12th day of the child's birth, although, according to one custom, it can be held on any day after the tenth day, and before the first birthday. In a land where cultures are based on the celebration of names of a million gods, the conscious choice and control over personal names and identities is as essential as breathing.

See also
 -onym
 American Name Society
 International Council of Onomastic Sciences (ICOS)
 Maiden name
 Middle name
 Moniker
 Name
 Name day
 Names
 Naming
 Nickname
 Nomenclature
 Onomatology
 Pen names
 Username

References

Awareness weeks in the United States
Name days
March observances